Grinin is a Russian masculine surname, its feminine counterpart is Grinina. It may refer to
Aleksey Grinin (1919–1988), Russian football striker and coach
Leonid Grinin (born 1958), Russian philosopher of history, sociologist and political anthropologist
Vladimir Grinin (born 1947), Russian diplomat

Russian-language surnames